Deerfield, Maryland may refer to:
Deerfield, Frederick County, Maryland
Deerfield, Garrett County, Maryland 
Deerfield, Harford County, Maryland

See also
 Deerfield (disambiguation)